Hot R&B Songs is a chart released weekly by Billboard in the United States. It lists the 25 most popular R&B songs, calculated weekly by airplay on rhythmic and urban radio stations, digital download sales and streaming data. It was established on October 11, 2012, as a way to highlight "the differences between pure R&B and rap titles in the overall, wide-ranging R&B/hip-hop field" and serves, along with the Rap Songs chart, as a distillation of the overall Hot R&B/Hip-Hop Songs chart.

Song achievements

Most weeks at number one

Source:

Artist achievements

Most number-one songs

Most number-one debuts

Artists with most weeks at number one on the chart

Most top ten hits

Most chart entries

Album achievements

Most number-one songs from one album

Most top ten songs from one album

Selected additional R&B Songs chart achievements 
Khalid is the first and only artist to occupy the entire top 5 of the R&B Songs chart. He achieved this on the chart dated April 20, 2019 with the songs "Better" and "Talk" staying steady at positions 1 and 2, respectively, while "My Bad" and "Saturday Nights" climbed up to numbers 3 and 4, and "Outta My Head" entered the chart at number 5.
 Khalid, The Weeknd, and Drake all hold the record for charting the most songs within the top 10 simultaneously – eight songs. Summer Walker holds the female record, with six, on the October 19, 2019 chart.

References

External links
Billboard R&B Songs Chart – online version.

Billboard charts